This is a list of TV episodes for the History Channel reality TV series IRT: Deadliest Roads, a spinoff series of Ice Road Truckers.

Series overview

Episodes

Season 1

Season 2

References 

IRT:Deadliest Roads